Burning Spirit was a professional wrestling event produced by New Japan Pro-Wrestling (NJPW). It took place on September 25, 2022, in Kobe, Japan at World Memorial Hall.

Storylines 
Burning Spirit featured nine professional wrestling matches that involved different wrestlers from pre-existing scripted feuds and storylines. Wrestlers portrayed villains, heroes, or less distinguishable characters in the scripted events that built tension and culminated in a wrestling match or series of matches.

Results

Notes

References

2022 in professional wrestling
New Japan Pro-Wrestling shows